Cre~Olé: The Best of Kid Creole & the Coconuts is the first compilation album released by the American musical group Kid Creole and the Coconuts. It was released on LP and Cassette in 1984 and reached number twenty-one on the UK Albums Chart. A CD edition was released in 1990. The compilation was the group's last record released by Island Records in the UK. The group's following two album's were released by Sire Records in the UK and the US. It includes the single "Don't Take My Coconuts".

In 1993, the compilation was re-released on CD and Cassette with new artwork and the additional track "I'm a Wonderful Thing, Baby (Brothers in Rhythm 7" Remix)". The song was also released as a single to promote the album.

Track listing

Personnel
August Darnell - producer
Andy Hernandez - co-producer ("Me No Pop I")
Bruno Tilley - art direction, design
Peter Ashworth - photography

Charts

References

1984 greatest hits albums
Kid Creole and the Coconuts albums
Island Records compilation albums